Parotis bracata is a moth in the family Crambidae. It was described by E. Hering in 1901. It is found in Indonesia (Sumatra).

References

Moths described in 1901
Spilomelinae